The 1992 Arab Super Cup was an international club competition played by the winners and runners up of the Arab Club Champions Cup and Arab Cup Winners' Cup. 
It was the 1st edition and was won by the host team and reigning Arab Club Champions Cup champions Wydad Athletic Club (winners of the last edition in 1989). Arab Club Champions Cup runners up Al-Hilal also came runners up once again. Olympique de Casablanca and El Mokawloon El Arab also took part.

Teams

Results and standings

Results in no particular order, dates of matches not known

External links
Arab Super Cup 1992 - rsssf.com

1992
arab 1992
1992 in African football
1992 in Asian football